The 1978 Bank of Oklahoma Grand Prix was a men's tennis tournament played on outdoor hard courts at the Shadow Mountain Racquet Club in Tulsa, Oklahoma in the United States that was part of the 1978 Colgate-Palmolive Grand Prix. It was the inaugural edition of the tournament was held from April 24 through April 30, 1978. Eddie Dibbs won the singles title and earned $8,500 first-prize money.

Finals

Singles
 Eddie Dibbs defeated  Pat DuPré 6–7, 6–2, 7–5
 It was Dibbs' 1st singles title of the year and the 14th of his career.

Doubles
 Van Winitsky /  Russell Simpson defeated  Carlos Kirmayr /  Ricardo Ycaza 4–6, 7–6, 6–2

References

External links
 ITF tournament edition details

Bank of Oklahoma Grand Prix
Bank of Oklahoma Grand Prix
Bank of Oklahoma Grand Prix
Tennis in Oklahoma